Anita Király (born 24 September 1971) is a Hungarian judoka. She competed in the women's middleweight event at the 1992 Summer Olympics.

References

1971 births
Living people
Hungarian female judoka
Olympic judoka of Hungary
Judoka at the 1992 Summer Olympics
Sportspeople from Eger